The fourth season of the American television romantic comedy-drama Sex and the City aired in the United States on HBO. The show was created by Darren Star while Star, Michael Patrick King, John P. Melfi, series lead actress Sarah Jessica Parker, Cindy Chupack, and Jenny Bicks served as executive producers. The series was produced by Darren Star Productions, HBO Original Programming, and Warner Bros. Television. Sarah Jessica Parker portrays the lead character Carrie Bradshaw, while Kim Cattrall, Kristin Davis and Cynthia Nixon played her best friends Samantha Jones, Charlotte York, and Miranda Hobbes.

Season four marks dramatic changes in the ladies' lives. Carrie gets back together with Aidan (John Corbett), eventually gets engaged and has him move in with her. Miranda, while maintaining her single life, supports Steve (David Eigenberg) through cancer and, after a one-night stand with him, becomes pregnant. Samantha dates a Brazilian lesbian artist Maria (Sônia Braga) and starts a serious relationship with her client and hotelier Richard (James Remar). Charlotte gets back together with Trey (Kyle MacLachlan) after their separation and after deciding to have a baby, struggle to get pregnant and ultimately separate for good.

The 4th season, comprising 18 episodes, continued airing on Sunday nights at 9:00 PM during the summer months, but unlike the previous seasons, the first twelve episodes aired during the summer, starting from June 3, 2001 and the remaining six aired during January and February 2002, ending on February 10, 2002. In the United Kingdom, the season was broadcast on Wednesday nights at 10:00 PM, two episodes a night, between January 9 and March 6, 2002. The season continued the series' critical and award success, with the series winning 3 Emmy awards, 2 Golden Globe awards, and a SAG award. Season four also achieved high ratings in the United States and United Kingdom.

The fourth season was released on DVD as a three-disc boxed set titled Sex and the City: The Complete Season 4 on May 20, 2003 by HBO Home Video.

Production
The fourth season of Sex and the City was produced by Darren Star Productions and Warner Bros. Television, in association with HBO Original Programming. The series is based on the book of the same name, written by Candice Bushnell, which contains stories from her column with the New York Observer. The show featured production from Antonia Ellis, Jane Raab and series star Sarah Jessica Parker, also an executive producer alongside Michael Patrick King, John Melfi, Cindy Chupack, and Jenny Bicks. Episodic writers return for the fourth season included Bicks, Chupack, Allan Heinberg, King, Julie Rottenberg, and Elisa Zuritsky. New writers enlisted for the season included Nicole Avril, Jessica Bendinger, and Amy B. Harris. The season was directed by returning directors Allen Coulter, King, Charles McDougall, Michael Spiller, and Alan Taylor. Directors new to the series included Martha Coolidge, Michael Engler, and David Frankel.

Cast and characters

Like the previous seasons, season four features the same principal cast and characters. Sarah Jessica Parker portrays Carrie Bradshaw, a fashionable thirty-something woman who writes about sex and life in New York City in her column, "Sex and the City", with the fictional New York Star. Kim Cattrall played the promiscuous public relations agent Samantha Jones. Kristin Davis portrayed Charlotte York MacDougal, an optimistic, strait-laced former art curator who remains the most traditional amongst her friends in terms of relationships and public decorum. Cynthia Nixon acted as the acerbic and sarcastic lawyer Miranda Hobbes, who holds a pessimistic view on relationships and men.

The fourth season featured a number of recurring and guest actors whose characters contributed significantly to the series plotlines. Chris Noth reprised his role as Mr. Big, a sly businessman who at this point remains friends with Carrie despite their previous romantic relationships. David Eigenberg portrayed Miranda's on-off boyfriend, bar owner and father of her child Steve Brady. Willie Garson played entertainment manager and Carrie's gay friend Stanford Blatch. Kyle MacLachlan appeared as Trey MacDougal, a doctor with Scottish ancestry and Charlotte's nearly impotent husband. John Corbett reprised his role as Aidan Shaw, a carpenter, bar owner and Carrie's boyfriend-turned-fiancé. Mario Cantone returns to the series as a recurring guest actor, portraying Charlotte's gay friend and former wedding planner Anthony Marantino. Sônia Braga joined the series as Maria Diega Reyes, an artist and Samantha's girlfriend. Frances Sternhagen reprised her role as Trey's overbearing and intrusive mother Bunny MacDougal; she received an Emmy nomination for her performance in the series. James Remar appeared in the fourth season as hotelier and Samantha's boyfriend Richard Wright. Lynn Cohen reprises her role as Magda, Miranda's foreign housekeeper.

"The Real Me" features cameo appearances from comedienne Margaret Cho, Alan Cumming, supermodel Heidi Klum, Ed Koch, Tony Hale, Kevyn Aucoin, Domenico Dolce, and Stefano Gabbana. Lucy Liu appeared as herself in the episode "Coulda, Woulda, Shoulda". In the episode "A 'Vogue' Idea", Candice Bergen portrayed Enid Mead, Carrie's publisher at Vogue magazine. Ron Rifkin played Carrie's boss Julian in the episode.

Reception

Viewership and ratings
Season four of Sex and the City debuted on June 3, 2001 with the episodes "The Agony and the 'Ex'-tacy" and "The Real Me". The episodes were seen by 6.49 million people and 5.93 million people respectively. Viewership for the first twelve episodes of the season held above five million viewers, with a majority of them crossing 5.5 million viewers. Unlike the second and third seasons, season four aired twelve episodes in the summer and the remaining six in the winter to make room for the new miniseries Band of Brothers. The remaining six episodes that aired in the winter set highs for the series, with the premiere episode "The Good Fight" attracting 7.30 million viewers and a 4.7 household rating, translating to 4.97 million households. Another reason for the split in season broadcast was the September 11, 2001 attacks on the World Trade Center in New York. It was deemed inappropriate to continue the Series' broadcast after the devastation in the same city the show was set, and would have seemed insensitive to the victims and families.
 The seventeenth episode "A 'Vogue' Idea", which was viewed by 4.34 million viewers, garnered the lowest ratings of the season. The season finale episode "I Heart NY" garnered the series' highest ratings at the time, 7.39 million viewers watching it upon initial broadcast and achieving a 4.9 household rating.

Critical reviews
Terry Kelleher of People Weekly commended the series, noting that "hasn't yet passed its freshness date." Ken Tucker of Entertainment Weekly was less enthusiastic about the season, praising the second episode for its theme but deemed the series tame, adding that "once you’ve programmed raunch like ”G-String Divas,” randy sitcoms just seem…randy."

Awards and nominations

At the 59th Golden Globe Awards, the series won the award for Best Television Series – Musical or Comedy for the third consecutive year. Sarah Jessica Parker also won the award for Best Actress – Television Series Musical or Comedy for the third consecutive year. John Corbett was nominated for the award for Best Supporting Actor – Series, Miniseries or Television Film, but lost to Stanley Tucci. At the 8th Screen Actors Guild Awards, the award for Outstanding Performance by an Ensemble in a Comedy Series was awarded to the main cast for Sex and the City. Parker and Kim Cattrall both received nominations for the award for Outstanding Performance by a Female Actor in a Comedy Series.

At the 54th Primetime Emmy Awards, Sex and the City received ten nominations and won awards for Outstanding Casting for a Comedy Series, Outstanding Costumes for a Series for the episode "Defining Moments", and Outstanding Directing for a Comedy Series for the episode "The Real Me", which directed by Michael Patrick King. The series was also nominated for the award for Outstanding Comedy Series for the fourth time, but lost to Friends. Parker was nominated for the award for Outstanding Lead Actress in a Comedy Series for the fourth time. Kim Cattrall and Cynthia Nixon were both nominated for an Outstanding Supporting Actress in a Comedy Series Emmy for their respective portrays of Samantha Jones and Miranda Hobbes, being Cattrall's third nomination and Nixon's first. 

Season four episodes "My Motherboard, My Self" and "Just Say Yes", written by Cindy Chupack and Julie Rottenberg & Elisa Zuritsky, were nominated for Best Writing - Episodic Comedy at the 2002 WGA Awards. Costume designer Patricia Field was nominated for the Costume Designers Guild Award for Best Costume Design – Contemporary TV Series. The Directors Guild of America nominated three episodes from season four - "Defining Moments" (directed by Allen Coulter), "My Motherboard, My Self" (directed by Michael Engler), and "The Real Me" (directed by Michael Patrick King) - for the award for Outstanding Directing – Comedy Series. At the 13th PGA Golden Laurel Awards, Cindy Chupack, Michael Patrick King, John P. Melfi and Sarah Jessica Parker were nominated for the award for Television Producer of the Year Award in Episodic - Comedy for their production work on the series.

Episodes

Ratings

United States

United Kingdom
All viewing figures and ranks are sourced from BARB.

Home release

References

2001 American television seasons
2002 American television seasons
Sex and the City